Priva socotrana is a species of plant in the family Verbenaceae. It is endemic to Yemen.

References

socotrana
Endemic flora of Socotra
Least concern plants
Taxonomy articles created by Polbot